The Horoat is a left tributary of the river Someș in Romania. It discharges into the Someș in Benesat.

References

Rivers of Romania
Rivers of Sălaj County